Antitrisuloides siamensis is a moth of the family Noctuidae. It is found in Thailand.

References

Pantheinae
Moths of Asia